{{Speciesbox
| image = Eudolium bairdii IMG 5347 Beijing Museum of Natural History - NHM of Guangxi - Gulf of Tonkin collection.jpg
| image_caption = Specimen from the Beijing Museum of Natural History
| genus = Eudolium
| species = bairdii
| authority = (Verrill & Smith in Verrill, 1881)
| synonyms_ref = 
| synonyms = Dolium (Eudolium) bituminatum Martin, 1933  Dolium (Eudolium) crosseanum var. solidior Dautzenberg & Fischer, 1906  Dolium bairdii Verrill & Smith in Verrill, 1881  Dolium bayrdi 'Verrill Paetel, 1887  Dolium biornatum Tate, 1894  Eudolium inflatum Kuroda & Habe, 1952  Eudolium kuroharai Azuma, 1960   Eudolium lineatum Osima, 1943  Morio lineata Schepman, 1909
}}Eudolium bairdii''''' is a species of large sea snail, a marine gastropod mollusk in the family Tonnidae, the tun shells.

Distribution
This marine species has a circumtropical distribution in the Atlantic, Indian, and Pacific Oceans.

Description
The maximum recorded shell length is 76 mm.

Habitat
Minimum recorded depth is 17 m and maximum recorded depth is 823 m.

References

Tonnidae
Molluscs of the Atlantic Ocean
Molluscs of the Indian Ocean
Molluscs of the Pacific Ocean
Gastropods described in 1881
Taxa named by Sidney Irving Smith
Taxa named by Addison Emery Verrill